Jo Gwang-il (born September 12, 1996) is a South Korean rapper and songwriter. He is known for his fast raps with Korean plosive sounds. He debuted in 2019 with the single "Grow Back". In 2020, he released his breakout single "Acrobat". He won the rap competition television show Show Me the Money 10 in 2021.

Early life 
Jo Gwang-il was born on September 12, 1996 in Nam-gu, Gwangju. He wanted to be a StarCraft gamer, but the company unexpectedly stopped its service. He turned his attention to music and began rapping at age 17. He graduated from Jeonnam Technical High School.

Career 
In 2019, Jo Gwang-il released his debut single "Grow Back". In April 2020, he released his breakout single "Acrobat". It peaked at number 18 on the Gaon Singing Room Chart and its music video amassed more than 10 million views. It also received positive reviews from critics and was nominated for Hip-hop Track of the Year at the Korean Hip-hop Awards. In October 2022, he released his debut studio album Dark Adaptation. In 2021, he won the rap competition television show Show Me the Money 10.

Philanthropy 
Jo Gwang-il donated the prize money of Show Me the Money 10 to Holt International Children's Services.

Discography

Studio album

EP

Singles

Filmography

TV

Awards and nominations

Notes

References

External links 

 

1996 births
Living people
People from Gwangju
Show Me the Money (South Korean TV series) contestants
South Korean male rappers